Wetmore is an unincorporated community in Bexar County, Texas, United States. It is part of the San Antonio–New Braunfels metropolitan area.

References 

Greater San Antonio
Unincorporated communities in Bexar County, Texas
Unincorporated communities in Texas